Monogram Lake is located in North Cascades National Park, in the U. S. state of Washington. Monogram Lake can be reached by trail from Snoqualmie National Forest. The lake is situated two miles east of Lookout Mountain, and 1.5 mile south of Little Devil Peak. The lake drains to the Cascade River via Monogram Creek.

References

External links
 Monogram Lake photo: Flickr

Lakes of Washington (state)
North Cascades National Park
Lakes of Skagit County, Washington